A gypsey is a name given to intermittent springs and streams in the Yorkshire Wolds, England. Gypseys are streams formed from springs from the waterladen chalk that constitutes the Yorkshire Wolds. The springs flow in late winter or early spring, with the water emanating through unbroken turf.

In Wiltshire and Dorset the same phenonoma is known as winterbournes, in Kent known as nailbournes, and as lavants in Hampshire.

See also
Gypsey Race, named stream in the north of the Yorkshire Wolds
Chalk stream

References

Water bodies in the East Riding of Yorkshire
Water streams
Springs (hydrology)
Yorkshire Wolds